The 1972 Mr. Olympia contest was an IFBB professional bodybuilding competition held in October  1972 at the Handelshof in Essen, West Germany.  It was the 8th Mr. Olympia competition held.

Results

Notable events

Arnold Schwarzenegger won his third consecutive Mr. Olympia title, tying the previous record held by Sergio Oliva
The winner was decided by seven judges, with Arnold Schwarzenegger receiving five first place votes

References

External links 
 Mr. Olympia

 1972
1972 in West German sport
1972 in bodybuilding
Bodybuilding competitions in Germany
Sport in Essen